Martin Knöri (born 1966) is a retired Swiss alpine skier.

He made his World Cup debut in November 1986 in Sestriere, collecting his first World Cup points with a 5th place. He managed three more top-10 placements throughout his World Cup career, including another 5th place in December 1990 in Kranjska Gora. His last World Cup outing came in January 1994 in Crans Montana.

References

1966 births
Living people
Swiss male alpine skiers
Date of birth missing (living people)
Place of birth missing (living people)